Germán Bleiberg (14 March 1915 - 31 October 1990) was a Spanish poet, playwright and translator, notable as part of the Generation of '36.

Life
Born in Madrid, where he also died, he studied at a college in Germany before gaining a license and a doctorate in Philosophy and Letters from the University of Madrid. During the Spanish Civil War he saw active service on the Republican side, winning the National Theater Prize jointly with Miguel Hernández for a now lost work in 1938. He fled to the United States of America after the Republicans' final defeat, becoming a professor at Notre Dame University and New York University. His works include the poetry collections "Sonetos amorosos" (1936), "Más allá de las ruinas" (1947), "La mutua primavera" (1948) and "Selección de poemas" (1975). He and Julián Marías, produced the noted "Diccionario de Literatura Española", republished several times.

Works

Poetry
 El cantar de la noche. Colección "La tentativa poética", published by Concha Méndez and Manuel Altolaguirre, Madrid, 1935.
 Sonetos amorosos. Ediciones Héroe, Madrid, 1936.
 Más allá de las ruinas. Revista de Occidente, Madrid, 1947.
 La mutua primavera. Colección "Norte", edited by Gabriel Celaya, San Sebastián, 1948.
 El poeta ausente, with illustrations by Gregorio Prieto. Madrid, 1948.
 Selección de poemas (1936-1973). Grant & Cutler, London, 1975.
 Antología poética. Alianza Editorial, Madrid, 1985.

Plays 

 Sombras de héroes. Editorial Signo, Madrid, 1938, in the collection Teatro de Urgencia.
 La huida, unpublished. Le valió el Premio Nacional de Literatura en 1938.
 Amanecer. published by Cuadernos de Madrid, Madrid, 1939.

Translations 

 Novalis, Granos de polen. Himnos a la noche. Enrique de Ofterdingen. México, Conaculta, 1987.

References

People from Madrid
1915 births
1990 deaths
Spanish dramatists and playwrights
Spanish poets
Converts to Roman Catholicism from Protestantism
Exiles of the Spanish Civil War in the United States
Complutense University of Madrid alumni
University of Notre Dame faculty
New York University faculty
Spanish academics